The Jerome Grand Hotel is a historic hotel that is in use in Jerome, Arizona. The hotel's motto is "Arizona's mile high historic landmark"

History

Founded as the United Verde Hospital
The Jerome Grand Hotel was originally constructed in 1926 under the name United Verde Hospital, owned by the United Verde Copper Company (UVCC), later to become Phelps Dodge Mining Corporation. Some knew it as the Phelps Dodge Hospital and United Verde Copper Hospital. It was the 4th and final hospital in Jerome. Opened in January 1927, the United Verde Hospital was a state-of-the-art medical facility; in 1930, listed as the most modern and well equipped hospital in Arizona and possibly in all of the western states. The hospital, however was closed in 1950, as the mining operations began shutting down and medical services were available in the neighboring community of Cottonwood, where many of the staff transferred to.  The building stood unused for the next 44 years.

As the Jerome Grand Hotel
The former hospital was purchased by Larry Altherr from Phelps Dodge Mining Corporation in 1994, and was renamed the Jerome Grand Hotel, opening for business in 1996.  Larry Altherr remains the owner.

Structure
The Jerome Grand Hotel is well noted to be the highest commercial building in the Verde Valley, being at a height of 5240 feet above sea level. The hotel was built as a Mission Revival Style of architecture and was the last major building to be constructed in Jerome. The building was considered by many a masterpiece of architecture because, not only was it constructed of poured-in-place concrete, but also at a 50 degree slope on solid bedrock, up against the slopes of Mingus Mountain. The 30,000 square foot building was designed to be fireproof-not one piece of wood is in the framework-and also earthquake proof, as it needed to withstand not only the rumblings of Mother Nature but also the blasts of 260,000 pounds of dynamite.

The Otis Elevator and the Kewanee Boiler
The Otis Elevator, which was Arizona's first self-service elevator, was installed in the United Verde Hospital in 1926 and serves all five levels of the building.  The elevator is regularly maintained and inspected, insuring safety for public use. This Otis elevator is different from modern elevators because, designed for hospital use, it travels much more slowly, at a distance of only 50 feet per minute, rather than the normal 800 feet per minute found on high rise buildings.  The Otis elevator is narrow and deep, designed for hospital equipment, such as gurneys and wheelchairs.  

The cast iron Kewanee Boiler, which was also installed in 1926, provides low pressure steam throughout the building. The Kewanee boiler, designed to not only be portable but also convertible, could operate on wood, coal or oil. When in use during the hospital days, the source was oil and has since been converted to operate using natural gas, producing between 800,000 and 2,500,000 BTUs. The Kewanee Boiler also utilizes a dual pump feature, so it need not be shut off for maintenance nor repair, insuring consistent pressure and warmth throughout the building.

Hauntings
While it operated as the United Verde Hospital and later became the Jerome Grand Hotel, many alleged hauntings have occurred. According to ghostlyfavorites.com., "Due to the high level of activity in the hotel, it is a quite popular destination for amateur ghost hunters". Guests that have stayed at the hotel reported to hear coughing, labored breathing, and even voices coming from empty rooms. Guests also reported smells coming from rooms, such as flowers, dust, cigar smoke, and whiskey. Others report light anomalies and the television sets turning themselves on with no explanation.

Many guests and hotel staff have heard and seen what appears to be a 4 or 5 year old child running down the hallway on the 3rd floor, sometimes crying or laughing.  This child also likes to appear at the foot of the bed in various rooms, just staring at the bed's occupant. Frequently, the sounds of giggling and running occur on the top floor, as though children are at play.  The sounds of a newborn baby's cry is common on the 3rd and 4th floors, as well as the faint smell of baby powder and zinc oxide. The baby's crying has alerted enough guests that they've phoned the front desk out of concern; the location being a vacant room.

Staff as well as guests frequently report bedside table lamps and televisions being unplugged, shampoo bottles rolling across the floor or flying across the room.  The sound of doors opening/closing while the room is otherwise vacant are common.  Guests have found electronics such as cell phones and camcorders dead center beneath the bed. Front Desk staff, particularly the graveyard shift, have reported hearing coughing and sneezing from the hotel's laundry room, seeing shadows in the same area of whom they believe to be Claude Harvey, the hospital's maintenance man who was found dead on April 3, 1935, pinned beneath the Otis elevator, presumably murdered. They see and hear Claude roaming the stairwells and the boiler room as though still at work. Many guests have reported seeing the apparitions of two ladies, one in a white gown, and another one in a nurse's outfit, as well as someone who appears to be a doctor or nurse in a long lab coat carrying a clipboard, roaming the halls.  A Spirit Cat is a frequent visitor to the hotel. Its origin unknown, the cat has been heard meowing, hissing and scratching at doors and walls. Both staff and guests have heard and felt the cat brushing against their legs and snuggling against them while on the bed. Most notable and commonplace is the imprint on the bedding of what is believed to be the cat curled up, that bedding moments earlier, smooth and straight. A photo, provided by a guest staying in Rm 20 in 2008, shows the cat very clearly sitting on a table, looking toward the photographer. Photos provided by staff and guests, as well as personal accounts are available for viewing on www.hauntedmania.com.  

During its hospital days, many deaths occurred from illness or injury, but also some rather suspicious in origin, like that of maintenance man Claude Harvey. Claude was found pinned by the back of the neck by the elevator, quite dead.  A thorough inspection of the elevator was done, as well as a coroner's inquest that determined the elevator could not have caused Claude's death.  No autopsy was allowed to be performed, nor x-ray taken, as the United Verde Copper Company, who owned the building, did not want suspicion pointing in their direction as accident nor intent. Claude's is the only death in the hospital whose cause has yet to be determined.  Speculation is, Mr. Harvey was murdered and his body placed in the elevator room, with his head hanging over the elevator shaft, to look like an accident.

Only one other known death since the hospital closed down in 1950, that of Manoah Hoffpauir, a local man hired by Phelps Dodge Mining Company to be a presence in the vacant building, hoping to offset the years of vandalism. Manoah was found hanging from a steam pipe in the Engineer's Office, where he resided while serving as the caretaker. His death in 1982 was ruled a suicide. During its days as the United Verde Hospital, an estimated 9000 deaths occurred, however no known records are present, so that number has yet to be validated.  When purchased in 1994 by Larry Altherr, the hospital records were gone, so any information regarding staff and patients is via word-of-mouth, with little or no verification.  The hospital was a general surgical hospital, meeting the needs of all who entered; unlike the name of the resident restaurant, a separate business from the hotel named Asylum, the building was never a mental health facility nor exclusive for tuberculosis patients.  

Due to the extreme privacy the hotel wishes to provide its guests, private tours have been discontinued and no one other than registered guests and staff are permitted on the guest floors.  The lobby (former emergency room) is open to the public 24/7 and the Asylum Restaurant (admitting and dispensary) is open to the public 11am-9pm Wednesday-Sunday.  A complete history, photos and online booking is available via the hotel's website:  www.jeromegrandhotel.net.  The hotel is open 365 days a year.

See also

 List of historic properties in Jerome, Arizona

References

Hotel buildings on the National Register of Historic Places in Arizona
Buildings and structures in Yavapai County, Arizona
Hotels in Arizona
Historic district contributing properties in Arizona
1926 establishments in Arizona
National Register of Historic Places in Yavapai County, Arizona
Mission Revival architecture in Arizona